Steve Williamson (born 28 June 1964) is an English saxophonist and composer (tenor saxophone, soprano saxophone, alto saxophone, keyboard and composition). He has been called "one of the most distinctive saxophone voices in contemporary British jazz".

Biography
Born in London, England, to Jamaican parents, Williamson began playing saxophone at the age of 16 and started his career playing in reggae bands, including Misty in Roots.

In 1984 and 1985 he studied at London's Guildhall School of Music, where he was tutored by Lionel Grigson. Williamson was a member of the noted collective of British-born black jazz musicians who came together as the Jazz Warriors in the mid-1980s.

At the Nelson Mandela 70th birthday open-air festival in 1988, Williamson played alongside Courtney Pine in Wembley Stadium, and afterwards was a constant presence at Ronnie Scott's Jazz Club. He was member of Louis Moholo's Viva La Black (1988) and of Chris McGregor's Brotherhood of Breath (1990). During the 1990s he led his own band and appeared in projects of Iain Ballamy, Maceo Parker, Bheki Mseleku, US3, and Graham Haynes.

In 1990, Williamson released his first album A Waltz for Grace with Verve, featuring vocalist Abbey Lincoln. In 1992, he released his second album, Rhyme Time, followed by Journey to Truth in 1994, featuring Cassandra Wilson.

Discography
As leader
 A Waltz for Grace (Verve, 1990) with Abbey Lincoln
 Rhyme Time (Verve, 1992) with Cassandra Wilson
 Journey To Truth (Nippon Phonogram, 1994)
 #One (Babel, 2014) with Black Top (Orphy Robinson, Pat Thomas)

As sideman
Jazz Warriors, Out of Many, One People (1987)

Sources
 Martin Kunzler, Jazz-Lexikon, vol. 2, 2002.

References

External links

 "Steve Williamson Pt.1", "Steve Williamson Pt.2". Interview by Michael J Edwards, UK Vibe.
 "Steve Williamson: Enigmatic Jazz Warrior meets Tomorrow’s Warriors", Ancient to Future, 12 July 2011.
 John Fordham, "Steve Williamson review – former Jazz Warrior back for next round", The Guardian, 3 September 2014.

Living people
Alumni of the Guildhall School of Music and Drama
English jazz saxophonists
British male saxophonists
Jazz saxophonists
Post-bop saxophonists
English people of Jamaican descent
Black British musicians
21st-century saxophonists
21st-century British male musicians
British male jazz musicians
Jazz Warriors members
1964 births